Adam Murray Selwood (born 1 May 1984) is a former Australian rules footballer who played for the West Coast Eagles in the Australian Football League (AFL). Originally from Bendigo, Victoria, Selwood played under-18 football for the Bendigo Pioneers in the TAC Cup before being recruited by West Coast in the third round of the 2002 National Draft. He made his debut for the club in 2003, and received a nomination for the AFL Rising Star two seasons later, in 2005. He retired at the end of the 2013 season, having played 187 games for the club.

Career
Selwood was recruited from Bendigo Pioneers as the West Coast Eagles' third pick, and number 53 overall in the 2002 AFL Draft. In 2003, his debut season, Selwood played two games including the losing elimination final against Adelaide. He played three games in 2004 before osteitis pubis curtailed his season.

In 2005, Selwood played 21 matches and received a rising star nomination in round 16. He was knocked unconscious in a collision with Adelaide captain Mark Ricciuto in round 22 but the forced layoff helped Selwood to recover from compartment syndrome. He returned in the preliminary final against Adelaide and played in the grand final against Sydney, which the Eagles lost by four points.

2006 saw him cement his place in the Eagles' starting 22, and build a reputation as a defensive midfielder. Selwood played in all of the 26 games for West Coast in 2006.

Selwood finished third in West Coast's club champion awards in both 2007 and 2008. He played all 22 games in 2008 and was a vice captain of the Australian team that played Ireland in the International Rules series.

Controversy
On 14 April 2007, Selwood was involved in an altercation with Fremantle's Des Headland. Both appeared before the AFL Tribunal on 18 April. Headland was charged with two counts of striking Selwood, and one count of wrestling with him, while Selwood was charged with using insulting language towards Headland. On 18 April, the tribunal found Selwood not guilty of using insulting language. It found Headland guilty of two of the three charges but elected not to impose a penalty.

Statistics

|- style="background-color: #EAEAEA"
! scope="row" style="text-align:center" | 2003
|style="text-align:center;"|
| 37 || 2 || 0 || 0 || 9 || 11 || 20 || 4 || 3 || 0.0 || 0.0 || 4.5 || 5.5 || 10.0 || 2.0 || 1.5 || 0
|-
! scope="row" style="text-align:center" | 2004
|style="text-align:center;"|
| 37 || 3 || 2 || 1 || 24 || 15 || 39 || 11 || 7 || 0.7 || 0.3 || 8.0 || 5.0 || 13.0 || 3.7 || 2.3 || 0
|- style="background:#eaeaea;"
! scope="row" style="text-align:center" | 2005
|style="text-align:center;"|
| 37 || 20 || 6 || 5 || 179 || 109 || 288 || 78 || 50 || 0.3 || 0.3 || 9.0 || 5.5 || 14.4 || 3.9 || 2.5 || 0
|-
! scope="row" style="text-align:center;" | 2006
|style="text-align:center;"|West Coast
| 37 || 26 || 8 || 6 || 267 || 239 || 506 || 147 || 72 || 0.3 || 0.2 || 10.3 || 9.2 || 19.5 || 5.7 || 2.8 || 0
|- style="background:#eaeaea;"
! scope="row" style="text-align:center" | 2007
|style="text-align:center;"|
| 37 || 23 || 1 || 2 || 208 || 259 || 467 || 142 || 60 || 0.0 || 0.1 || 9.0 || 11.3 || 20.3 || 6.2 || 2.6 || 5
|-
! scope="row" style="text-align:center" | 2008
|style="text-align:center;"|
| 37 || 22 || 7 || 6 || 230 || 161 || 391 || 110 || 47 || 0.3 || 0.3 || 10.5 || 7.3 || 17.8 || 5.0 || 2.1 || 0
|- style="background:#eaeaea;"
! scope="row" style="text-align:center" | 2009
|style="text-align:center;"|
| 37 || 21 || 8 || 7 || 231 || 284 || 515 || 84 || 76 || 0.4 || 0.3 || 11.0 || 13.5 || 24.5 || 4.0 || 3.6 || 4
|- 
! scope="row" style="text-align:center" | 2010
|style="text-align:center;"|
| 37 || 16 || 6 || 5 || 179 || 200 || 379 || 74 || 68 || 0.4 || 0.3 || 11.2 || 12.5 || 23.7 || 4.6 || 4.3 || 0
|- style="background:#eaeaea;"
! scope="row" style="text-align:center" | 2011
|style="text-align:center;"|
| 37 || 25 || 3 || 4 || 245 || 185 || 430 || 102 || 57 || 0.1 || 0.2 || 9.8 || 7.4 || 17.2 || 4.1 || 2.3 || 0
|- 
! scope="row" style="text-align:center" | 2012
|style="text-align:center;"|
| 37 || 20 || 2 || 1 || 155 || 117 || 272 || 70 || 42 || 0.1 || 0.1 || 7.8 || 5.9 || 13.6 || 3.5 || 2.1 || 0
|- style="background:#eaeaea;"
! scope="row" style="text-align:center" | 2013
|style="text-align:center;"|
| 37 || 9 || 0 || 0 || 61 || 38 || 99 || 21 || 13 || 0.0 || 0.0 || 6.8 || 4.2 || 11.0 || 2.3 || 1.4 || 0
|- class="sortbottom"
! colspan=3| Career
! 187
! 43
! 37
! 1788
! 1618
! 3406
! 843
! 495
! 0.2
! 0.2
! 9.6
! 8.7
! 18.2
! 4.5
! 2.6
! 9
|}

Personal life
A member of the Selwood family, Selwood has three brothers; twin brother Troy, Joel, and Scott.

Selwood has a Bachelor of Commerce degree from Curtin University.

Advocacy
In June 2007, Selwood, alongside his brothers and their parents Maree and Bryce, were named AFL celebrity ambassadors for Seeing Eye Dogs Australia. In January 2010, Selwood became an ambassador for the Meningitis Centre. He had previously contracted HIB meningitis at two years old.

References

External links

 
 

1984 births
Bendigo Pioneers players
Curtin University alumni
East Perth Football Club players
Living people
Australian rules footballers from Bendigo
Sandhurst Football Club players
Australian twins
Twin sportspeople
West Coast Eagles players
West Coast Eagles Premiership players
Identical twins
Australia international rules football team players
One-time VFL/AFL Premiership players